Jacob Weary (born February 14, 1990) is an American actor. He is known for starring as Luke Snyder in the CBS soap opera As the World Turns, Vince Keeler in NBC's action-drama series Chicago Fire, and Deran Cody in the TNT drama series Animal Kingdom. He played Kevin Lebow in Fred: The Movie (2010), its two sequels, and the television adaptation, Nickelodeon's Fred: The Show, He also had roles in the horror films It Follows (2014) and It Chapter Two (2019).

Career

Acting
Weary initially made a guest appearance on the long-running CBS soap opera Guiding Light in 2002, in which his mother, actress Kim Zimmer, portrayed Reva Shayne. After guest appearances on Law & Order: Special Victims Unit and Listen Up!, he was cast as Luke Snyder on another of CBS's long-running soaps, As the World Turns. He would remain with the show until December 2005, when actor Van Hansis stepped into the role after Weary left to focus on his schoolwork.

After making his film debut as a hall monitor in Assassination of a High School President in 2008, Weary was cast as Kevin Lebow, a central antagonist in the films Fred: The Movie (2010), Fred 2: Night of the Living Fred (2011), Fred 3: Camp Fred (2012), and the Nickelodeon television adaptation, Fred: The Show. Weary has since appeared as Sal in Kaare Anderson's 2010 film Altitude and Hugh in the 2015 horror-thriller It Follows.

Weary starred as Deran Cody in the TNT criminal drama Animal Kingdom, based on the 2010 Australian film of the same name.

Personal life
Weary was born in Trenton, New Jersey, to Daytime Emmy Award-winning actress Kim Zimmer and actor and director Allen Cudney "A.C." Weary. He married his longtime girlfriend Vera Bulder in October 2019.

Filmography

Film

Television

Web

References

External links 
 

1990 births
Male actors from New Jersey
American male child actors
American male film actors
American hip hop musicians
American male soap opera actors
American male television actors
Living people
Musicians from Trenton, New Jersey
Actors from Trenton, New Jersey
21st-century American male actors
21st-century American musicians